Nicolás Factor (29 June 1520 – 23 December 1583) was a Spanish Roman Catholic priest and a professed member from the Order of Friars Minor as well as a painter of the Renaissance period. Factor served as an apt preacher across his region - despite wanting to be sent to the foreign missions - and was noted for his practices of self-mortification before he gave sermons.

Pope Pius VI beatified Factor on 27 August 1786.

Life
Nicolás Factor was born in Valencia in Spain on 29 June 1520 as one of five children to a poor tailor.

In his childhood he fasted three times a week and donated all of his untouched food to the poor and also tended to the ill - he visited a leper hospital as well. His Moorish maid was so affected with this that she learnt about the faith and converted to Roman Catholicism. His father wanted him to follow his path but Factor wanted to follow his own and so decided to become a priest and a religious.

He entered the Order of Friars Minor on 30 November 1537 and was sometime later ordained as a priest. He painted a range of devotional images. Factor became a sought after itinerant preacher (his request to go to the foreign missions was denied) across his region and was known for undergoing rather severe self-mortifications before he gave each sermon. He also served as the spiritual director of the Santa Clara convent since 1571 in Madrid at the request of Joan of Habsburg. In April 1582 he relocated to the Santa Caterina convent in Onda and that November moved to another convent in Barcelona.

Factor died after a period of illness on 23 December 1583 after having just returned to Valencia. In 1586 his remains were exhumed for King Philip II - who wished to view them - and his remains were found to be incorrupt.

La primera biografia de Nicolás Factor, Libro de la vida y obras maravillosas del Padre Fray Pedro Nicolás Factor de Cristóbal Moreno del Camino, fue publicada en el año 1586.

Beatification
Pope Pius VI beatified the late Franciscan on 27 August 1786. The beatification process saw three friends of Factor summoned to provide witness testimonies and the tribunal called upon Paschal Baylón and Louis Betrand as well as Juan de Ribera (whom Factor served).

References

External links
Saint Nicholas Factor
Saints SQPN

1520 births
1583 deaths
16th-century venerated Christians
16th-century Spanish painters
Spanish male painters
16th-century Spanish Roman Catholic priests
People from Valencia
Spanish Renaissance painters
Spanish beatified people
Venerated Catholics
Catholic painters
Beatifications by Pope Pius VI